Aenigmina latimargo is a moth of the family Sesiidae. It is known from Tanzania.

References

Sesiidae
Moths described in 1912